Colin Simms (born 1939) is a British biologist, curator and poet.

Career

Biologist and curator
Simms was appointed Keeper of Biology at the Yorkshire Museum in 1964. He held this position until 1982.

Poet
Simms has produced several collections, and more than forty pamphlets, of poetry, inspired by wildlife and the natural world. These varied works were collected into a series of publications, organised by the subject, by Shearsman Books. The first publication was Otters and Martens in 2004, followed by The American Poems (2005), Gyrfalcon Poems (2007), Poems from Afghanistan (2013), and Hen Harrier Poems.

In a 2015 Guardian review of Hen Harrier Poems, Simms' poetry of the last half-century was described as of "huge importance, thrilling for the rigour and commitment of its vision". He won 3rd prize in the inaugural Laurel Prize for environmental poetry in 2020, for Hen Harrier. His work, in a discussion of great Yorkshire poets, has also been described as "not as well known as it should be".

Select publications
1968. "A List of Botanical and Zoological Collections at the Yorkshire Museum, York, The Naturalist 904 (April–June 1968), 85-89.
1970. Lives of British Lizards. 
2007. Gryfalcon Potems. Bristol, Shearsman Books.
2015. Hen Harrier Poems. Bristol, Shearsman Books.

References

1939 births
Yorkshire Museum people
British curators
21st-century British poets
20th-century British poets
20th-century British biologists
Living people